Johan Kristoffersen  (9 July 1889 – 22 January 1953) was a Norwegian nordic combined skier who won the event at the 1911 Holmenkollen ski festival. He earned the Holmenkollen Medal in 1914.

References
Holmenkollen medalists - click Holmenkollmedaljen for downloadable pdf file 
Holmenkollen winners since 1892 - click Vinnere for downloadable pdf file 

1889 births
1953 deaths
Holmenkollen medalists
Holmenkollen Ski Festival winners
Norwegian male Nordic combined skiers
20th-century Norwegian people